Franklinton High School is a public school for secondary education located near Franklinton, North Carolina, United States, about  southeast of the town. It serves the rapidly expanding western areas of Franklin County and has seen significant growth in the past several years. The new campus was constructed in 2010 to replace the old high school that was built in the town of Franklinton in 1923. The new high school currently serves grades 9 through 12 for students residing in the Franklinton and Youngsville areas. There was originally a high school located in Youngsville, but it was closed and students in Youngsville began attending Bunn High School in 1978. Youngsville High School was demolished and a new elementary school was built in its place, called Youngsville Elementary School. The new Franklinton High School was opened to students on August 25, 2011 to start the 2011–2012 school year.

Franklinton High School is three floors although the building is situated on an incline. The lower level (downhill side) primarily consists of the cafeteria, auditorium, gymnasium and trade wing including art, music, technology, shop and agriculture. All of the sports fields are also on the downhill side heading towards Cedar Creek. Two floors are on the upper level (uphill side) which consist of the administrative offices and library along with the English, math, science, social studies and foreign language wings.

History 
The old high school initially started as a graded school for white students in 1924, first known as Franklinton Public School. When schools were fully integrated in 1969, the upper grades were consolidated with B.F. Person-Albion High School which had educated African-American students. The lower grades were moved to that school and was renamed Franklinton Elementary School. Franklinton Public School became Franklinton High School. From 1969 until 2011, Franklinton High School included grades 6 through 12 before the new building was constructed.

Demographics 
Student Demographics – 1,182 Students Enrolled
38% White, 35% Black, 20% Hispanic, 6% Two or More Races, .7 Asian, .3% American Indian

See also 
 Franklin County Schools

References 

 Franklinton High School; Town of Franklinton (1992). A Walk Through History: A Town Called Franklinton Celebrates Its 150th. Edited by Cheryl Faye Hollar. Cypress Creek Publications. Library of Congress Card Catalog #92-003897.
 Youngsville Museum of History. Franklinton High School: Credits, Retrieved Oct. 18, 2014.
 Franklinton High School website. Franklinton High School: Credits, Retrieved Oct. 18, 2014.
 The Franklin Times: Back to School 2013. Franklinton High School: Credits, Retrieved Oct. 18, 2014.
 The News & Observer: A State Title for Franklinton High at Long Last (May 26, 2014). Franklinton High School: Credits, Retrieved Oct. 21, 2014.
 WRAL High School OT.com: Longtime Franklinton coach Trent Sanders dies (September 14, 2014). Franklinton High School: Credits, Retrieved Oct. 21, 2014.

External links 
 Franklinton High School (Official Website)
 Franklin County Schools
 Franklinton High School Bands

Public high schools in North Carolina
Schools in Franklin County, North Carolina